Andrae, Andræ (Danish) or Andrä is a surname and given name, which is a variant of Andreae, itself a patronymic (via the Latin genitive case) from the personal name Andreas. 
Notable persons with this name include:

Surname 
 Ahmed-Tobias Andrä (1996), Austrian footballer 
 Alexander Andrae (1888–1979), German military officer 
 Björn Andrae (1981), German volleyball player
 Carl Christoffer Georg Andræ (1812–1893), Danish politician and mathematician
 Elisabeth Andrae (1876–1945), German Post-Impressionist landscape painter and watercolorist
 Emil Andrae (2002), Swedish ice hockey defenceman
 Hansine Andræ (1817–1898), Danish feminist
 Tor Andræ (1885–1947), Swedish clergyman, professor and scholar of comparative religion
 Walter Andrae (1875–1956), German archaeologist and architect

Given name 
 Andrae Campbell (1989), Jamaican footballer
 Andraé Crouch (1942–2015), American gospel singer, songwriter, arranger, record producer and pastor
 Andrae Patterson (1975), American former basketball player
 Andrae Thurman (1980), American footballer
 Andrae Williams (1983), Bahamian sprinter
 Andrae Sutherland (1988), aka Popcaan - Dancehall artist

References

Patronymic surnames
German-language surnames
Swedish-language surnames
Danish-language surnames
Surnames from given names